James C. Bucklin (1801-1890) was an American architect working in Providence, Rhode Island.

Life and career
Bucklin was born on 26 July 1801, in a part of Rehoboth that is now part of Pawtucket, Rhode Island, to James and Lorania (Pearce) Bucklin. His father died 6 December 1802, and his widow moved to Providence with her son. Bucklin attended the town's public schools. At the age of 14 he was apprenticed to early architect-builder John Holden Greene, working there for seven years. In 1822, at the age of 21, he established a partnership with William Tallman (d.1862). The firm of Tallman & Bucklin was a design-build firm, similar to Greene's business. in 1846, 20-year-old Thomas A. Tefft began working for Tallman & Bucklin. Before long, Tefft was doing most of the firm's design work. This continued until 1851, when Tefft finished his studies at Brown University and established his own office. Also at this time, Tallman & Bucklin's partnership was dissolved. Bucklin worked alone for many years. By 1880 he had taken his son, James A. Bucklin (1840-1901), as a partner in J. C. Bucklin & Son. Although son James largely took over the practice, he remained active until his death in September 1890. The office was succeeded by J. A. Bucklin & Company.

In 1829 Bucklin married Lucy Dailey of Providence. They had five surviving children, including son James. Lucy Bucklin died in November, 1888.

Bucklin was a member of the Squantum Association and the Providence Athenaeum, and was considered "a great reader of good books". He was a member of the Providence common council from the fifth ward for the years 1839-41 and 1842-43. He was a member of the First Light Infantry.

Legacy
Despite having fallen into relative obscurity, Bucklin was a very prominent designer in Providence from the 1840s to the 1870s. He designed at least half a dozen Westminster Street office buildings, as well as several more in other parts of downtown. From 1839 to 1844 Tallman & Bucklin had charge of the city's first major period of school-building, designing 12 buildings citywide. Bucklin also was the designer of several other municipal structures.

Works

 Earl Pearce Duplex, 42-44 Benefit St., Providence, RI (1827)
 Enoch W. Clarke House, 66 Benefit St., Providence, RI (1828)
 Westminster Arcade, 65 Weybosset St., Providence, RI (1828) - With Russell Warren.

For buildings built 1830-31, see Russell Warren.

 Remodeling of Providence City Building, 4 N. Main St., Providence, RI (1833) - Served as City Hall until 1878.
 Remodeling of Beneficent Congregational Church, 300 Weybosset St., Providence, RI (1836) - Built in 1809.
 Shakespeare Hall, 128 Dorrance St., Providence, RI (1838) - Closed in 1844, renovated into a warehouse in 1854.
 Arnold Street School, 41 Arnold St., Providence, RI (1839–40) - Demolished.
 Benefit Street School, 21 Benefit St., Providence, RI (1839–40) - Demolished.
 Elm Street School, Elm St. at Parsonage, Providence, RI (1839–40) - Demolished.
 Fountain Street School, 157 Fountain St., Providence, RI (1839–40) - Demolished.
 Knight Street School, 347 Knight St., Providence, RI (1839–40) - Demolished.
 Summer Street School, Summer & Pond Sts., Providence, RI (1839–40) - Demolished.
 President's Residence, 72 College St., Brown University, Providence, RI (1840) - Demolished 1908.
 Rhode Island Hall, Brown University, Providence, RI (1840)
 East Street School, 28 East St., Providence, RI (1841) - Demolished.
 Prospect Street School, 45 Prospect St., Providence, RI (1841) - Demolished. Site of the Corliss-Brackett House.
 Federal Street School, 97 Federal St., Providence, RI (1842) - Demolished.
 Washington Buildings, Memorial Blvd. & Westminster St., Providence, RI (1843) - Demolished. Now the site of the Hospital Trust Building.
 Providence High School, 205 Benefit St., Providence, RI (1844) - Later owned by the state. Demolished.
 Rhode Island Historical Society, 68 Waterman St., Providence, RI (1844) - Now Brown University's Mencoff Hall.
 Exchange Building, 30 Kennedy Plaza, Providence, RI (1845)

For buildings built 1846-51, see Thomas A. Tefft.

 Howard Building, 171 Westminster St., Providence, RI (1856) - Demolished.
 Blackstone Block, 27 Weybosset St., Providence, RI (1861) - Demolished 1979.
 Hiram Hill Duplex, 63-65 Charlesfield St., Providence, RI (1864)
 Union Railroad Co. Car Barn, 333 Bucklin St., Providence, RI (1865)
 Hay Buildings, 117-135 Dyer St., Providence, RI (1866)
 Monohasset Mill, 532 Kinsley Ave., Providence, RI (1866)
 Root Building, 180 Westminster St., Providence, RI (1866) - Burned 1890.
 Addition to Rhode Island State House, 150 Benefit St., Providence, RI (1867–68)
 Reynolds Building, 37 Weybosset St., Providence, RI (c.1867) - Demolished.
 Thomas Davis House, 830 Chalkstone Ave., Providence, RI (1869) - Demolished. The seat of a large estate, now Davis Park.
 Barstow Block, 386 Westminster St., Providence, RI (1871) - Also housed the Providence Music Hall. Demolished 1955.
 Hoppin Homestead Building, 283 Westminster St., Providence, RI (1875) - Demolished 1979.
 Brownell Building, 107 Westminster St., Providence, RI (1878) - Demolished 1925.
 Billings Block, 250 Westminster St., Providence, RI (1880) - Demolished 1896.
 Amos C. Barstow House, 245 Morris Ave., Providence, RI (1886) - Altered.

References

1801 births
1890 deaths
Architects from Pawtucket, Rhode Island
Architects from Providence, Rhode Island
19th-century American architects
People from Pawtucket, Rhode Island